The Disrupt is the debut studio album by American hip hop musician Oh No. It was released on October 5, 2004 by Stones Throw Records.

Track listing

References

External links

Stones Throw Records albums
2004 debut albums
Oh No (musician) albums
Albums produced by Oh No (musician)
Albums produced by Madlib
Albums produced by J Dilla